Nigger Head was the name of a small island in the northern part of Shelburne Bay in far north Queensland, Australia about 30 km north of Cape Grenville, Cape York Peninsula in the Great Barrier Reef Marine Park Queensland, Australia. It was named so because it is an isolated coral outcrop; such outcrops were known as niggerheads by British sailors.

In August 2017 it was announced that the name Nigger Head would no longer be used by the Department of Natural Resources and Mines which is responsible for naming places in Queensland. In September 2017 the Queensland government stated that a new name would be chosen for the island, although a new name was never selected and the island remains officially unnamed.

See also

 Bird Islands (Queensland)
 List of islands of Australia
 Use of nigger in proper names

References

Islands on the Great Barrier Reef
Uninhabited islands of Australia